Family Game or The Family Game may refer to:

 The Family Game, a 1983 Japanese film
 The Family Game (2013), a Japanese TV drama series adapted from the 1983 film
 The Family Game (game show), an American TV game show
 Family Game (console), an Argentine clone of the Nintendo Entertainment System console
 Family Game (2007 film), a 2007 Italian film
 Family Game (2022 film), a 2022 Canadian film
 Family board game, a category of board games

See also 
 Family Game Night (disambiguation)